The Ministry of Environmental Protection and Agriculture of Georgia (sakartvelos garemos datsvisa da soplis meurneobis saministro) is a governmental agency within the Cabinet of Georgia in charge of regulation of economic activity in the agricultural sector of the country and environment protection with a purpose of increasing the sector's production capacity. The ministry is headed by Gigla Agulashvili.

Structure
The ministry is headed by a minister, first deputy minister and two deputy ministers. It is subdivided into General Inspection, Management Unit for Food Safety and Risk Analysis, Department of Cooperation with International Organizations and Projects Management which overlook divisions on Rural Development, Region Rule, Legal Issues, etc. In December 2017, the Ministry of Environment and Natural Resources Protection was abolished and merged into that of Agriculture, which was renamed into the Ministry of Environmental Protection and Agriculture of Georgia.

Ministers after 2004
 David Shervashidze, February 2004 – December 2004
 Mikheil Svimonishvili, December 2004 – November 2006
 Petre Tsiskarishvili, November 2006 – May 2008
 Bakur Kvezereli, April 2008 – October 2011
 Zaza Gorozia, October 2011 – October 2012
 David Kirvalidze, October 2012 – April 2013
 Shalva Pipia, April 2013 – 
 Otar Danelia, December 30, 2015 – September 9, 2016
 Levan Davitashvili, September 9, 2016 – present

See also
Cabinet of Georgia
Agriculture in Georgia

References

Agriculture
Georgia
Agricultural organisations based in Georgia (country)